Marco Osio (born 13 January 1966 in Ancona) is an Italian former football midfielder, and former manager of Ancona 1905.

Career

As player 
Osio started his playing career in the Torino youth system. In 1986, he moved at Empoli, and Parma in 1987. In his stay at Parma, he became one of the fan favourites, earning the nickname "Il Sindaco" (The Mayor) by the local supporters, and he was a key player for the team that climbed the Italian football divisions, up from Serie C1 to the top division, Serie A. During his time with the club, he enjoyed both domestic and European success, winning the Coppa Italia, and the European Cup Winners' Cup, also participating in the UEFA Cup. In 1993, after six seasons with Parma, he returned to Torino for two seasons before an unexpected move to Brazilian club Palmeiras, which makes him one of the very few Italian footballers to have ever played in the South-American country; he won the Paulista Championship with the club in 1996, despite having played only a handful of minutes for the club. After a few experiences at the Serie C level, he retired in 2001.

As coach 
In 2001 Osio became assistant manager of Serie C2 club Brescello. He was successively promoted to the head coaching position in 2002.

From December 2003 to February 2005 he served as head coach of Serie D side Valle d'Aosta and in the latter matchdays of the 2005–2006 season he coached Pergolese, another Serie D team. In 2006–07, Osio served as head coach of Crociati Parma (also known as Crociati Noceto), with whom he won Eccellenza and ensured promotion to the 2007–08 Serie D.
 In July 2007, he was chosen by Serie C2 club Nuorese for their head coaching position. He was however sacked on 17 September due to poor results in the beginning of Nuorese's 2007–08 Serie C2 campaign (one point in three matches).

On 12 January 2011 he became the new coach of Fortis Juventus in Serie D in place of the sacked Roberto Galbiati.

On 29 November 2011 he becomes the new coach of Ancona 1905 in Serie D, in place of the sacked Massimiliano Favo, until 3 February 2012 when he rescinds the contract by mutual agreement with the company.

Honours
Parma
Coppa Italia: 1991–92
European Cup Winners' Cup: 1992–93

Palmeiras
Paulista Championship: 1996

References

External links
Playing career

1966 births
Living people
Sportspeople from Ancona
Italian footballers
Serie A players
Serie B players
Serie C players
Torino F.C. players
Parma Calcio 1913 players
Empoli F.C. players
Sociedade Esportiva Palmeiras players
U.S. Pistoiese 1921 players
Virtus Bergamo Alzano Seriate 1909 players
Italian expatriate footballers
Expatriate footballers in Brazil
Association football midfielders
Italian football managers
Rimini F.C. 1912 managers
Footballers from Marche